This is a complete bibliography by American science fiction author Larry Niven:

Tales of Known Space
 World of Ptavvs (1966)
 A Gift from Earth (1968)
 Neutron Star (1968 collection)
 The Shape of Space (1969 collection)
 Protector (1973)—Hugo and Locus SF Awards nominee, 1974
 Tales of Known Space: The Universe of Larry Niven (1975 collection)
 Three Books of Known Space (1996 reprint of Tales of Known Space, with "Madness Has Its Place" in place of "The Borderland of Sol", bundled with World of Ptavvs and A Gift from Earth)
 The Long ARM of Gil Hamilton (1976 collection, reprinted as Flatlander in 1995 with additional content including The Patchwork Girl)
 The Patchwork Girl (1980)
 World of Ptavvs / A Gift From Earth / Neutron Star (1991 omnibus)
 Crashlander: The Collected Tales of Beowulf Shaeffer (1994 collection)

Ringworld
 Ringworld (1970)—Nebula Award, 1970 Hugo and Locus SF Awards winner, 1971 
 The Ringworld Engineers (1979)—Hugo and Locus SF Awards nominee, 1981
 Guide to Larry Niven's Ringworld (1994, with Kevin Stein)
 The Ringworld Throne (1996)
 Ringworld's Children (2004)

Worlds series (with Edward M. Lerner)
 Fleet of Worlds (2007)
 Juggler of Worlds  (2008)
 Destroyer of Worlds (2009)
 Betrayer of Worlds (2010)
 Fate of Worlds (2012)—Also serves as conclusion to Ringworld series

Man-Kzin Wars
 Man-Kzin anthologies
 The Man-Kzin Wars (1988)
 Man-Kzin Wars II (1989)
 Man-Kzin Wars III (1990)
 Man-Kzin Wars IV (1991)
 Man-Kzin Wars V (1992)
 Man-Kzin Wars VI (1994)
 Man-Kzin Wars VII (1995)
 Man-Kzin Wars VIII: Choosing Names (1998)
 The Best of All Possible Wars: The Best of the Man-Kzin Wars (1998)
 Man-Kzin Wars IX (2002)
 Man-Kzin Wars X: The Wunder War (2003)
 Man-Kzin Wars XI (2005)
 Man-Kzin Wars XII (2009)
 Man-Kzin Wars XIII (2012)
 Man-Kzin Wars XIV (2013)
 Man-Kzin Wars XV (2019)

 Man-Kzin novels
 Cathouse: A Novel of the Man Kzin-Wars (1990, with Dean Ing)
 Cathouse compiles two stories from the first two "Man-Kzin Wars" books and contains no new material.
 The Children's Hour: A Novel of the Man-Kzin Wars (1991, with Jerry Pournelle and S. M. Stirling)
 The Children's Hour contains some material previously published in "Man-Kzin Wars" volumes II and III.
 Inconstant Star (1991, with Poul Anderson)
 Inconstant Star compiles two stories from "Man-Kzin Wars" volumes I and III and contains no new material.
 A Darker Geometry (1996, with Mark O. Martin and Gregory Benford)
 A Darker Geometry contains some material previously published in "Man-Kzin Wars" volume VII.
 The Houses of the Kzinti (2002, with Dean Ing, Jerry Pournelle, S. M. Stirling)
 Houses of the Kzinti is a compiled edition of the previously-published Cathouse and The Children's Hour and contains no new material.
 Destiny's Forge: A Man-Kzin Wars Novel (2007, with Paul Chafe)

The State
 A World Out of Time (1976)—Locus SF Award nominee, 1977
 The Integral Trees (1984)—Nebula Award nominee, 1984; Locus SF Award winner, and Hugo nominee, 1985
 The Smoke Ring (1987)

Magic Goes Away
 Not Long before the End (1969)
 What Good Is a Glass Dagger? (1972)
 The Magic Goes Away (1978)
 The Magic May Return (1981)
 More Magic (1984)
 The Time of the Warlock (1984)
 The Magic Goes Away Collection (2005 omnibus)

Heorot
 The Legacy of Heorot (1987) (with Steven Barnes and Jerry Pournelle) (release order book 1)
 Beowulf's Children (1995, UK: The Dragons of Heorot) (with Barnes and Pournelle) (book 2)
 The Dragons of Heorot (1996) (with Steven Barnes and Jerry Pournelle) (UK version of book 2)
 Destiny's Road (1997) (by Niven alone; not precisely a continuation of the Heorot series: located in the same universe, events from the first two novels are briefly mentioned) (book 3)
 The Secret of Black Ship Island (2012) (novella; with Steven Barnes and Jerry Pournelle) (book 4)
 Starborn & Godsons (2020) (with Barnes and Pournelle) (release order book 5) (stated book 3 in series)

With Jerry Pournelle
 Lucifer's Hammer (1977)—Hugo Award nominee, 1978
 Oath of Fealty (1981)
 Footfall (1985)—Hugo and Locus SF Awards nominee, 1986
Lucifer's Anvil or Samael's Forge (in-progress as of 2013) (not a sequel to Lucifer's Hammer) 
Dante series
 Inferno (1976)—Hugo and Nebula Awards nominee, 1976
 Escape from Hell (2009)
Moties—part of Pournelle's CoDominium fictional universe
 The Mote in God's Eye (1974)—Hugo, Nebula and Locus SF Awards nominee, 1975
 The Gripping Hand (1993, UK: The Moat Around Murcheson's Eye)
Golden Road (set in the same "Magic Universe" as The Magic Goes Away)
 The Burning City (2000)
 Burning Tower (2005)
 Burning Mountain (in progress)

With Steven Barnes
 The Descent of Anansi (1982)
 Achilles' Choice (1991)
 Saturn's Race (2001)
 The Seascape Tattoo (2016) (part of the Magic Goes Away universe)

Dream Park
 Dream Park (1981)—Locus SF Award nominee, 1982
 The Barsoom Project (1989)
 The California Voodoo Game (1992, UK: The Voodoo Game)
 The Moon Maze Game (2011)

With Gregory Benford
Bowl of Heaven
 Bowl of Heaven (2012)
 Shipstar (2014)
 Glorious (2020)

Other novels
 The Flying Sorcerers (1971, with David Gerrold), previously serialized as "The Misspelled Magishun", includes portraits of other science fiction authors—e.g. the lead character name becomes translated into the local language as "As a color, shade of purple-gray" (or Purple for short), that is, "As-A-Mauve"
 Berserker Base: A Collaborative Novel (1984, with Poul Anderson, Edward Bryant, Stephen R. Donaldson, Fred Saberhagen, Connie Willis, and Roger Zelazny)
 Fallen Angels (1991, with Jerry Pournelle and Michael Flynn)
 Building Harlequin's Moon (2005, with Brenda Cooper)
 The Goliath Stone (2013, with Matthew Joseph Harrington)

Other collections
 All the Myriad Ways (1971)
 The Flight of the Horse (1973) 
Includes five "Svetz" stories later collected in Rainbow Mars, plus two other stories.
 Inconstant Moon (1973) 
UK collection, includes "Known Space" and non-"Known Space" stories.
 A Hole in Space (1974)
 Convergent Series (1979)
 Niven's Laws (1984)
 Limits (1985)
 N-Space (1990)
 Playgrounds of the Mind (1991)
 Bridging the Galaxies (1993)
 Rainbow Mars (1999)
 Scatterbrain (2003)
 Larry Niven Short Stories Volume 1 (2003)
 Larry Niven Short Stories Volume 2 (2003)
 Larry Niven Short Stories Volume 3 (2003)
 The Draco Tavern (2006)
 Stars and Gods (August 2010)
 The Best of Larry Niven (November 2010)
 Red Tide (October 2014)
With Brad R. Torgersen & Matthew J. Harrington
 Madness from the Inconstant Moon: A Collection of Short Works from Larry Niven (April 2017) 
Reissue of All the Myriad Ways with new comments from the author.

Graphic novels and comics adaptations
 "Not Long before the End" was adapted by Doug Moench and Vicente Alcazar (May 1975), and "All the Myriad Ways" by writer-artist Howard Chaykin (Sep 1975), both for Marvel Comics' black-and-white anthology magazine Unknown Worlds of Science Fiction.
 The Magic Goes Away, graphic novel by Paul Kupperberg (writer) and Jan Duursema (artist), DC Comics (1986)
 A.R.M. (1990, Malibu Comics), adaptation of Death by Ecstasy
 Death by Ecstasy: Illustrated Adaptation of the Larry Niven Novella (1991)
 Green Lantern: Ganthet's Tale (1992, DC Comics) (with John Byrne)
 Ringworld: The Graphic Novel (2014, Tor), adapted by Robert Mandell and drawn by Sean Lam
 Ringworld: The Graphic Novel, Part Two (2015, Tor), adapted by Robert Mandell and drawn by Sean Lam

References

Bibliographies by writer
Bibliographies of American writers
Science fiction bibliographies
Fantasy bibliographies